Rəcəbli (also, Radzhabli) is a village and municipality in the Tartar Rayon of Azerbaijan.  It has a population of 484.  The municipality consists of the villages of Rəcəbli and Kövdadıq.

References 

Populated places in Tartar District